Brenton Township is one of twelve townships in Ford County, Illinois, USA.  As of the 2010 census, its population was 973 and it contained 436 housing units.  The township was originally called Stockton Township and was formed from a portion of Patton Township on March 15, 1859; the name was changed to Brenton Township on May 9, 1864.

Geography

Cities, towns, villages
 Piper City (vast majority)

Cemeteries
The township contains Brewton Cemetery.

Major highways
  US Route 24
  Illinois Route 115

Airports and landing strips
 Bradbury Airport

Demographics

School districts
 Iroquois West Community Unit School District 10
 Prairie Central Community Unit School District 8
 Tri Point Community Unit School District 6-J

Political districts
 Illinois' 15th congressional district
 State House District 105
 State Senate District 53

References
 
 United States Census Bureau 2007 TIGER/Line Shapefiles
 United States National Atlas

External links
 City-Data.com
 Illinois State Archives

Townships in Ford County, Illinois
Townships in Illinois